The Flathead River, in the northwestern part of the U.S. state of Montana, originates in the Canadian Rockies to the north of Glacier National Park and flows southwest into Flathead Lake, then after a journey of , empties into the Clark Fork. The river is part of the Columbia River drainage basin, as the Clark Fork is a tributary of the Pend Oreille River, a Columbia River tributary.

Course 
The Flathead River rises in forks in the Rocky Mountains of northwestern Montana. The largest tributary is the North Fork, which runs from the Canadian province of British Columbia southwards. The North Fork is sometimes considered the main stem of the Flathead River. Near West Glacier the North Fork combines with the Middle Fork to form the main Flathead River. The river then flows westwards to join the South Fork and cuts between the Whitefish Range and Swan Range via Bad Rock Canyon. All of the headwaters forks are entirely or in part designated National Wild and Scenic Rivers. After the river leaves the canyon it flows into the broad Flathead Valley and arcs southwest, passing Columbia Falls and Kalispell, before it is joined by the Stillwater River and its Whitefish River tributary, and then empties into Flathead Lake, where the Swan River joins.

Near Polson the river leaves the natural basin of Flathead Lake, but first passes through Seli’š Ksanka Qlispe’ Dam (formerly Kerr Dam), which raises Flathead Lake's level by 10 feet. After flowing through the dam the river turns south and meanders through the Flathead Valley west of the Mission Mountains, and at Dixon it is joined by the small Jocko River. At the Jocko River confluence it turns west, and a few miles after flows into the Clark Fork near Paradise.

History 
David Thompson (explorer) first explored the area in 1807. Fur traders employed by the North West Company and Hudson's Bay Company entered the Flathead Valley in the early 19th century. Trading posts were established north of Flathead Lake. The 1846 settlement of the Oregon Boundary Dispute established the border with British North America and that the Flathead Valley was firmly American. The first settlers began arriving in the 1860s. Irrigation agriculture began in the 1880s.

The river was affected by the 2022 Montana floods.

Recreation
The river is a Class I river in Montana for purposes of recreational access. The South fork of the Flathead, from Youngs Creek to Hungry Horse reservoir; Middle fork of the Flathead – from Schaffer creek to its confluence with the Flathead River; and the Flathead River – to its confluence with the Clark Fork River, are designated.

Conservation

It is part of the National Wild and Scenic Rivers System. Reaches designated wild and scenic include the entire North Fork south of the Canada–US border, the entire Middle Fork, and the South Fork above Hungry Horse Reservoir.

The North Fork Flathead River in Montana is designated a National Wild and Scenic River.  The river is not afforded any protection in British Columbia.  This has been the subject of 33 years of dispute between the United States and Canada.  In 1988 the International Joint Commission, ruled that a proposed open pit coal mine would violate the 1909 Boundary Waters Treaty.

Energy development once threatened the North Fork, which was deemed the "wildest river in the continental United States" by The New York Times in 2004.  On February 21, 2008, BP announced to drop  plans to obtain drilling rights for coalbed methane extraction in the river's headwaters. However, the Cline Mining Corporation still intends to start a mountaintop-removal coal mining project.

On February 9, 2010, the British Columbia government announced that it would not permit mining, oil and gas development and coalbed gas extraction in British Columbia's portion of the Flathead Valley, which was praised by environmental groups and the U.S. Senators from Montana.

There is a proposal to protect one-third of British Columbia's Flathead River by adding it to the Waterton-Glacier International Peace Park. In 2003 Parks Canada requested the province of British Columbia to take part in a park feasibility study.  British Columbia has yet to agree to this.

Further reading

See also 

 List of rivers of Montana
 Montana Stream Access Law
 Montana Wilderness Association
 Tributaries of the Columbia River
 Flathead Lake

References

External links 

 http://www.nwcouncil.org/fw/subbasinplanning/flathead/plan/
 Flathead Wild.  Keep it Wild.  Keep it Connected.
 Wildsight

Rivers of Flathead County, Montana
Rivers of Lake County, Montana
Rivers of Sanders County, Montana
Rivers of Montana
Wild and Scenic Rivers of the United States